The 1998 Skoda Czech Open was a women's tennis tournament played on outdoor clay courts at the I. Czech Lawn Tennis Club in Prague in the Czech Republic that was part of Tier III of the 1998 WTA Tour. The tournament was held from 6 July through 12 July 1998. First-seeded Jana Novotná won the singles title.

Finals

Singles

 Jana Novotná defeated  Sandrine Testud 6–3, 6–0
 It was Novotná's 4th singles title of the year and the 23rd of her career.

Doubles

 Silvia Farina /  Karina Habšudová defeated  Květa Hrdličková /  Michaela Paštiková 2–6, 6–1, 6–1
 It was Farina's only title of the year and the 3rd of her career. It was Habšudová's 1st title of the year and the 3rd of her career.

See also
 1998 Paegas Czech Open – men's tournament

References

External links
 WTA tournament profile

Skoda Czech Open
Prague Open
1998 in Czech tennis